"Get It" is a song recorded by American singer-songwriter Stevie Wonder with a guest vocal by American pop recording artist Michael Jackson. Taken from his 21st studio album Characters in 1987, the song was the third single released from Wonder's album.

At the time of the single's release, and their albums released in the same year, Wonder worked with Jackson on his top-selling Bad album for their first duet "Just Good Friends".
"Get It" was R&B chart hit (number 4). On the US Billboard Hot 100 it peaked at number 80. Overseas, the single became a moderate hit. In the UK, the single reached number 37 on the official UK Singles Chart.

Background
Jackson and Wonder had a history of collaborating with each other over the years. The first dating back to 1974, in which Wonder crafted and produced a Jackson 5 album, which was eventually shelved. (One of those songs recorded, "Buttercup" appears on the 2009 compilation album I Want You Back! Unreleased Masters, released after Jackson's death.)

That same year, Jackson and his brothers provided backing vocals to Wonder's hit "You Haven't Done Nothin'" from his parent album Fullfillingness' First Finale. Both Wonder and Jackson were part of an all-star choir including Donna Summer's 1982 single "State of Independence" and 1985's "We Are the World", which Jackson co-wrote and both singles produced by Quincy Jones.

Jackson worked with Wonder again for the song "I Can't Help It" for Jackson's 1979 breakthrough album Off the Wall, which was written by Wonder and former Supremes member Susaye Greene. Within a year, Jackson also did background vocal work on "All I Do" from Wonder's platinum-selling Hotter than July album.

Reception
Cash Box called it a "light dance tune, heavy on groove, low on fat" that is "exciting and accessible" and praised Wonder's "patented skipping base feel and percussive sound" and Jackson's singing.

Personnel 
 Stevie Wonder - lead vocals, backing vocals, synthesizers, bass guitar, drums, and synthesized percussion
 Michael Jackson - lead vocals
 Mary Lee Evans - backing vocals
 Ben Bridges - guitar

Chart positions

References 

1987 songs
1988 singles
Stevie Wonder songs
Michael Jackson songs
Motown singles
Songs written by Stevie Wonder
Song recordings produced by Stevie Wonder
Song recordings produced by Quincy Jones
Male vocal duets